The Bet Israel Synagogue is the largest synagogue in the city of İzmir, Turkey. It was built in 1907 and is in the Karataş quarter of the city. It's one of the two major synagogues in İzmir, the other being the recently built Shaar Hashamaym synagogue.

İzmir's Jewish community was granted state permission to build the synagogue in 1905; it opened two years later.

After 1908, Rabbi Abraham Palacci served as the synagogue's hazzan.

On April 4, 2019, an attacker threw a Molotov cocktail at the synagogue. Falling on the sidewalk, the bomb did not destroy the synagogue. The attacker claimed that they were trying to protest the state of Israel. A prominent member of the ruling Justice and Development Party immediately condemned the attack. The official said, "There is no difference between attacks targeting synagogues, churches and mosques; they all target social peace with their hate." İzmir's Jewish community praised local law enforcement for their quick action.

See also 
List of synagogues in Turkey
History of Jews in Turkey

References 

Synagogues in Turkey
Buildings and structures in İzmir
Jews and Judaism in İzmir
Synagogues completed in 1907
1907 establishments in the Ottoman Empire
21st-century attacks on synagogues and Jewish communal organizations
Konak District
20th-century religious buildings and structures in Turkey